Cheltenham, also known as Cheltenham Spa, is a spa town and borough on the edge of the Cotswolds in the county of Gloucestershire, England. Cheltenham became known as a health and holiday spa town resort, following the discovery of mineral springs in 1716, and claims to be the most complete Regency town in Britain.

The town hosts several festivals of culture, often featuring nationally and internationally famous contributors and attendees; they include the Cheltenham Literature Festival, the Cheltenham Jazz Festival, the Cheltenham Science Festival, the Cheltenham Music Festival, Cheltenham International Film Festival, the Cheltenham Cricket Festival, and the Cheltenham Food & Drink Festival. In steeplechase horse racing, the Gold Cup is the main event of the Cheltenham Festival, held every March.

History

Cheltenham stands on the small River Chelt, which rises nearby at Dowdeswell and runs through the town on its way to the Severn. It was first recorded in 803, as Celtan hom; the meaning has not been resolved with certainty, but latest scholarship concludes that the first element preserves a pre-British noun cilta, 'steep hill', here referring to the Cotswold scarp; the second element may mean 'settlement' or 'water-meadow'. As a royal manor, it features in the earliest pages of the Gloucestershire section of Domesday Book where it is named Chintenha[m]. The town was awarded a market charter in 1226.

Though little remains of its pre-spa history, Cheltenham has been a health and holiday spa town resort since the discovery of mineral springs there in 1716. Captain Henry Skillicorne (1678–1763), is credited with being the first entrepreneur to recognise the opportunity to exploit the mineral springs. The retired "master mariner" became co-owner of the property containing Cheltenham's first mineral spring upon his 1732 marriage to Elizabeth Mason. Her father, William Mason, had done little in his lifetime to promote the healing properties of the mineral water apart from limited advertising and building a small enclosure over the spring. Skillicorne's wide travels as a merchant had prepared him to see the potential lying dormant on this inherited property. After moving to Cheltenham in 1738, he immediately began improvements intended to attract visitors to his spa. He built a pump to regulate the flow of water and erected an elaborate well-house complete with a ballroom and upstairs billiard room to entertain his customers. The beginnings of Cheltenham's tree-lined promenades and the gardens surrounding its spas were first designed by Captain Skillicorne with the help of "wealthy and traveled" friends who understood the value of relaxing avenues. The area's walks and gardens had views of the countryside, and soon the gentry and nobility from across the county were enticed to come and investigate the beneficial waters of Cheltenham's market town spa.

The visit of George III with the queen and royal princesses in 1788 set a stamp of fashion on the spa. The spa waters can still be sampled at the Pittville Pump Room, built for this purpose and completed in 1830; it is a centrepiece of Pittville, a planned extension of Cheltenham to the north, undertaken by Joseph Pitt, who laid the first stone 4 May 1825.

Cheltenham's success as a spa town is reflected in the railway station, which is still called Cheltenham Spa, and spa facilities in other towns that were inspired by or named after it.

Alice Liddell and Lewis Carroll were regular visitors to a house in Cudnall Street, Charlton Kings – a suburb of Cheltenham. This house was owned by Alice Liddell's grandparents, and still contains the mirror, or looking glass, that was purportedly the inspiration for Lewis Carroll's novel Through the Looking-Glass, published in 1871.

Horse racing began in Cheltenham in 1815, and became a major national attraction after the establishment of the Festival in 1902. Whilst the volume of tourists visiting the spa has declined, the racecourse attracts tens of thousands of visitors to each day of the festival each year, with such large numbers of visitors having a significant impact on the town.

In the Second World War, the United States Army Services of Supply, European Theatre of Operations established its primary headquarters at Cheltenham under the direction of Lt. Gen. John C. H. Lee, with the flats of the Cheltenham Racecourse becoming a giant storage depot for countless trucks, jeeps, tanks and artillery pieces. Most of this materiel was reshipped to the continent for and after the D-Day invasion. Lee and his primary staff had offices and took residence at Thirlestaine Hall in Cheltenham.

On 1 April 1974, under the Local Government Act 1972, the borough of Cheltenham was merged with Charlton Kings urban district to form the non-metropolitan district of Cheltenham. Four parishes—Swindon Village, Up Hatherley, Leckhampton and Prestbury—were added to the borough of Cheltenham from the borough of Tewkesbury in 1991.

The first British jet aircraft prototype, the Gloster E.28/39, was manufactured in Cheltenham. Manufacturing started in Hucclecote near Gloucester, but was later moved to Regent Motors in Cheltenham High Street (now the Regent Arcade), considered a location safer from bombing during the Second World War.

Geography
Cheltenham is on the edge of the Cotswolds, an Area of Outstanding Natural Beauty in the South-West region of England. The small River Chelt flows under and through the town.

Neighbourhoods

The districts of Cheltenham include: Arle, Benhall, Charlton Kings, Fairview, Fiddler's Green, Hesters Way, Lansdown, Leckhampton, Lynworth, Montpellier, Oakley, Pittville, Prestbury, the Reddings, Rowanfield, St Luke's, St Mark's, St Paul's, St Peter's, Springbank, Swindon Village, Tivoli, Up Hatherley, Whaddon and Wyman's Brook.

Montpellier
Located at the end of the Promenade South of the town centre, affluent Montpellier is known for its bars, restaurants and specialist shops. Surrounded by many grade one listed buildings, Montpellier Gardens are part of the Cheltenham Central Conservation Area.

Pittville
Similarly affluent, but more a garden suburb in nature, is Pittville, known for its large park (the southern part of which is lined with large Regency terraces and villas) and the Pump Room, the largest of Cheltenham's former spa buildings, now a concert and events venue.

Lansdown Crescent
Lansdown Crescent is a Regency period terrace, designed by John Buonarotti Papworth for R.W. and C. Jearrad and constructed in the 1830s. The terrace is convex, and opposite the north-eastern part stands Lansdown Court, an Italianate villa possibly designed by Papworth but more probably by the Jearrads and built about 1830.

Charlton Park
Charlton Park is a former  historic park with mansion house, about a mile south-east of the town centre. From 1935 the parkland gradually became a private residential area, the main housing development taking place between 1976 and 1983. The original mansion house dated from the 13th century; alterations throughout the centuries transformed it from a medieval, timber-framed hall-house into an 18th-century brick-faced mansion in the classical style. In the 1780s the estate was emparked for deer and had magnificent Dutch-style water gardens. After 1935 the old house became part of Charlton Park Convent, and since 1987 has been part of St Edward's School.

Green belt 

Parts of the town has green belt along its fringes, and this extends into the surrounding Tewkesbury district, helping to maintain local green space, prevent further urban sprawl and unplanned expansion towards Gloucester and Bishop's Cleeve, as well as protecting smaller villages in between. West of the Greenfield Way and Fiddlers Green Lane roads, along with much of the open space up to the Civil Service Sports Ground, as well as the Cheltenham Racecourse and surrounding green park, along with St Peter Leckhampton parish church and Brizen Playing Fields/Haven and Greenmead parks along the south of the borough, are covered.

Government

Cheltenham Borough Council is the local authority for Cheltenham; it is split into 20 wards, with a total of 40 councillors elected to serve on the borough council. Since 2002, elections have been held every two years with half of the councillors elected at each election.

GCHQ

The head office of the British Government Communications Headquarters (GCHQ), known to locals as The Doughnut, is located in Cheltenham.

Climate
As with the vast majority of the British Isles, Cheltenham experiences a temperate oceanic climate (Cfb in the Köppen climate classification). It has warm summers and cool winters. The town held the British maximum temperature record from 1990 to 2003—temperatures reached . During a typical year, 145.6 days will report at least 1 mm of rain, and some 42.2 nights will record air frost.

Economy

As a Regency spa town, tourism is an important sector in Cheltenham's economy, but it also has some light industry, including food processing, aerospace and electronics businesses. The Government's electronic surveillance operation Government Communications Headquarters (GCHQ), known for its "doughnut-shaped" building, is in Cheltenham. Vertex Data Science, GE-Aviation, Chelsea Building Society, Endsleigh Insurance, Archant, Nelson Thornes, UCAS (Universities & Colleges Admissions Service), Kohler Mira, Zürich Financial Services, Douglas Equipment, Volo and Spirax-Sarco Engineering all have sites in and around Cheltenham.

A number of design agencies and businesses are located in the town. Weird Fish was founded in Cheltenham. SuperGroup plc, owner of the Superdry label, has its headquarters in Cheltenham.

Cheltenham is a regional shopping centre, home to department stores, the oldest being Cavendish House, from 1823, and the Regent Arcade.

The Beechwood Shopping Centre in the town centre was demolished in 2017 to make way for a £30million, 115,000 square foot John Lewis store.

Cheltenham has a Michelin one-star restaurant, Le Champignon Sauvage.

Employment and salary
The unemployment rate in Cheltenham was 2.7% in 2010 compared to the UK national unemployment level of 7.9%. The average GVA per head in Cheltenham was £21,947.27 in 2011 compared to the national average of £26,200.

In 2012, The Guardian found that, at the end of 2011, 41 multi-millionaires lived in Cheltenham, which was the fourth-highest rate in the UK of multi-millionaires per 100,000 people at 35.44.

Culture 

Architecture

The town is known for its Regency architecture and is said to be "the most complete regency town in England". Many of the buildings are listed, including the Cheltenham Synagogue, judged by Nikolaus Pevsner to be one of the architecturally best non-Anglican ecclesiastical buildings in Britain.

Cheltenham Town Hall was built in 1902 to commemorate the coronation of King Edward VII and Queen Alexandra.

Art
The Cheltenham Art Gallery & Museum, also called The Wilson, hosts a programme of art exhibitions running throughout the year. The Wilson was named after polar explorer Dr Edward Wilson, who was born in Cheltenham.

In 2014, many of the town's historic cultural and leisure buildings were put under the control of The Cheltenham Trust, a charity set up to manage and develop the buildings on behalf of the town. Along with The Wilson, the Trust now manages the Town Hall, the Pittville Pump Room, the Prince of Wales Stadium and Leisure @, a large fitness and swimming complex. A volunteer board of Trustees controls the Trust. The Trust's CEO is Julie Finch, former director of museums in Bristol.

In 2014, a piece of graffiti by street artist Banksy appeared next to a telephone box in a residential street in Cheltenham. The graffiti depicted three men in trench coats and dark glasses apparently listening in to calls made in the telephone box.

Cheltenham features several sculptural artworks of note, including:

Neptune's Fountain in the Promenade, built in 1893 and designed by Joseph Hall
The Hare and the Minotaur, also in the Promenade, created in 1995 by Sophie Ryder
A life-size bronze of an Emperor Penguin by Nick Bibby and placed in the foyer of The Wilson art gallery and museum in 2015
The Wishing Fish Clock in the Regent Shopping Arcade, unveiled in 1987 and designed by Kit Williams

Music

Cheltenham hosts the annual Cheltenham Music Festival, Cheltenham Jazz Festival and the Ukulele Festival of Great Britain.

In 2010, Cheltenham was named the UK's fifth "most musical" City by PRS for Music.

History
The collection's of the Cheltenham Art Gallery & Museum include decorative arts from the era of the Arts and Crafts Movement. The collection enjoys National Designation by the Arts Council of England.
The Holst Birthplace Museum contains personal belongings of the composer of The Planets, including his piano. It also includes a working Victorian kitchen and laundry, Regency drawing room and an Edwardian nursery.

The Cheltenham Civic Society has been responsible for erecting commemorative plaques in the town since 1982: blue plaques to celebrate well-known people and green plaques to celebrate significant places and events.

Festivals
Every year, Cheltenham Festivals organises music, jazz, literature and science festivals in the town, attracting names with national and international reputations in each field. Events take place at venues including the town hall, the Everyman Theatre, the Playhouse Theatre and the Pittville Pump Room.

Several other cultural festivals, including the Cheltenham International Film Festival, Cheltenham Paranormal Festival, the Cheltenham Design Festival, Cheltenham Folk Festival, Cheltenham Poetry Festival, The True Believers Comic Festival and Cheltenham Comedy Festival are separately organised but also attract international performers and speakers. A more local event, the Cheltenham Festival of the Performing Arts (formerly Cheltenham Competitive Festival) is a collection of more than 300 performance competitions that is the oldest of Cheltenham's arts festivals, having been started in 1926.

Greenbelt, a Christian arts and music festival, and Wychwood Festival, a family-friendly folk and world music festival, were held at Cheltenham Racecourse. The town also hosts the multi-venue Walk the line festival.

Two sporting events are also routinely described as the "Cheltenham Festival" or "the Festival": the Cheltenham Cricket Festival, which features Gloucestershire County Cricket Club, and National Hunt racing's Cheltenham Festival.

Film and television
Cheltenham has played host to and featured in a number of film and TV series:
 Butterflies location work was predominantly filmed in Cheltenham.
 If.... (1968) was filmed at Cheltenham College (and other locations).
 The Whistle Blower, a spy thriller, was largely filmed in Cheltenham, as GCHQ is central to the plot.
 The Full Monteverdi, a 2007 British film written and directed by John La Bouchardière, was partly filmed in Cheltenham.
 The House of Eliott, a British television series produced and broadcast by the BBC between 1991 and 1994, was partly filmed in Cheltenham.
 Vanity Fair, a BBC serialised adaptation of William Makepeace Thackery's novel of the same name, was partly filmed in Cheltenham.
The Thistle Golden Valley Hotel was used by the ITV soap opera Crossroads for outdoor location filming from 1982 to 1985.

Theatre
Cheltenham has four theatres: the Everyman, the Playhouse, the Bacon and the Parabola Arts Centre.

Demography
Population
Inhabitants of Cheltenham are known as "Cheltonians".

Ethnicity
According to the 2011 census, the ethnic breakdown of the population of Cheltenham is as follows:

White British: 88.3%
White Irish: 0.9%
White, other: 5.0%
Mixed: 1.9%
Asian : 3.2%
Black : 0.6%

Crime and public safety

In 2013, Cheltenham was named one of the safest towns for university students to live in the UK by the Complete University Guide.

Police

Gloucestershire Constabulary is the territorial police force responsible for policing the town covering 14 neighbourhoods in the Cheltenham area.

Education

The oldest school in Cheltenham is Pate's Grammar School (founded in 1574). Cheltenham College (founded in 1841) was the first of the public schools of the Victorian period. The school was the setting in 1968 for the classic Lindsay Anderson film if..... It also hosts the annual Cheltenham Cricket Festival, first staged in 1872, and the oldest cricket festival in the world.

The most famous school in the town, according to The Good Schools Guide, is Cheltenham Ladies' College (founded in 1853). Dean Close School was founded in 1886 in memory of the Reverend Francis Close (1797–1882), a former rector of Cheltenham. The town also includes several campuses of the University of Gloucestershire, two other independent and six other state secondary schools, plus institutions of further education.

Sport and leisure

Cheltenham Racecourse, in the nearby village of Prestbury, is the home of National Hunt, or jumps, racing in the UK. Meetings are hosted from October to April. The highlight of the season is the Cheltenham Gold Cup, which is normally held in the middle of March, during the Cheltenham Festival.

The town's football teams are the professional team Cheltenham Town F.C., who play in the Football League One, and semi-professional sides Bishop's Cleeve, who play in the Hellenic League Premier, Cheltenham Saracens F.C. in the Hellenic League Division One and more recently Montpellier Football Club, founded in 2021 by Liam Bond and Sam Collier and currently boasting a senior first team, a development team and a newly founded women's team.

Amateur rugby union clubs include Cheltenham R.F.C., Cheltenham Saracens RFC, Cheltenham North R.F.C., Old Patesians R.F.C., Smiths Rugby and Cheltenham Civil Service R.F.C.

In rugby league, university side Gloucestershire All Golds were admitted into the semi-professional Championship 1. The Cheltenham Rugby Festival is a rugby league nines event held in May.

The town has one golf course, Lilley Brook, in Charlton Kings.

Cheltenham has one of the largest croquet clubs in the country, and is home to the headquarters of the national body of the sport, the Croquet Association. The East Glos tennis, squash and women's hockey club, which was founded in 1885, is also located in the town.

Sandford Parks Lido is one of the largest outdoor pools in England. There is a  main pool, a children's pool and paddling pool, set in landscaped gardens. Sandford Parks Lido is the home of Cheltenham Swimming and Water Polo Club. In 2021, Cheltenham Borough Council gave Sandford Parks Lido a new 35-year lease to continue operating the lido.

Cheltenham Festival

Cheltenham Festival is a significant National Hunt racing meeting, and has race prize money second only to the Grand National. It is an event where many of the best British and Irish trained horses race against each other, the extent of which is relatively rare during the rest of the season.

The festival takes place annually in March at Cheltenham Racecourse. The meeting is often very popular with Irish visitors, mostly because of that nation's affinity with horse racing, but also because it usually coincides with St. Patrick's Day, a national holiday in celebration of the patron saint of Ireland.

Large amounts of money are bet during festival week, with hundreds of millions of pounds being gambled over the four days. Cheltenham is often noted for its atmosphere, most notably the "Cheltenham roar", which refers to the enormous amount of noise that the crowd generates as the starter raises the tape for the first race of the festival.

Transport

Railways

Cheltenham Spa railway station is located on the Bristol-Birmingham main line, with services to Gloucester, Bristol, Swindon, London Paddington, Cardiff Central, Bridgend, Maesteg, Plymouth and the South West, Birmingham, Derby, the North West, the North East and Scotland. The station is located to the west of the Montpellier area of the town and is known locally as "Lansdown".

The Cheltenham Spa Express, once known as the Cheltenham Flyer, is a named passenger train connecting Cheltenham with London. The town has had seven railway stations, but never had a direct route towards Oxford and London which have always been reached via Gloucester and Stroud.

The restored Cheltenham Racecourse railway station is the southern terminus of the heritage Gloucestershire Warwickshire Railway. The Honeybourne Line is being extended northwards to Broadway, with an eventual aspiration to extend the line southwards to Cheltenham Spa where the line originally branched off from the Bristol to Birmingham main line.

Roads
Cheltenham is adjacent to the M5 motorway, between Bristol and Birmingham, and its junction with the A417 to Swindon and the A40 runs from across the M5 through the town towards Oxford and London.

Buses and coaches
Stagecoach West operate the majority of bus services in Cheltenham, including services to Gloucester and Tewkesbury.

National Express operate a number of coach services from Cheltenham including route 444 to London and Heathrow airport. Before becoming part of National Express, Cheltenham was a major hub for Black and White coaches, with routes throughout the country, many of which formed a mass exodus through the town at 14:30 each day.

Tramroad
Cheltenham was a terminus of the Gloucester and Cheltenham Tramroad.

Churches

The first parish church is Cheltenham Minster, St Mary's, which is the only surviving medieval building in the town. As a result of expansion of the population, absorption of surrounding villages, and the efforts of both evangelical and Anglo-Catholic missions, the town has a large number of other parish churches, including Trinity Church and All Saints', Pittville, where the composer Gustav Holst's father was the organist.

St Gregory's Roman Catholic church is an example of the work of the architect Charles Hansom. The Gothic Revival building was built 1854–57, the porch was added in 1859, the tower and spire were completed in 1861 and the nave was extended to join the tower in 1877. The church's s stained glass is by Hardman & Co.

Bell ringing
The town has three rings of bells hung for change ringing. One is located in St Mark's Church - a ring of 8 bells, with the heaviest being some 16cwt. These were originally a ring of 5 bells cast at John Taylor of Loughborough in 1885, extensively overhauled and augmented in 8 in 2007. Another is at St. Christopher's (Warden Hill), the lightest ring of church bells in the world. The other is a ring of 12 bells hung in St. Mary's Church (the Minster). These were the venue in 2008 for the eliminators of the National 12 Bell Striking contest, in which teams of campanologists from around the world compete to win the Taylor Trophy. In 2017 the old ring of 12 was completely replaced with new bells cast by John Taylor & Co. The tenor bell is just over a ton in weight, and the new ring also includes a thirteenth bell, a sharp 2nd, to provide a lighter 8. The towers in the locality of Cheltenham belong to the Cheltenham branch of the Gloucester & Bristol Diocesan Association of Church Bell Ringers.

Twin towns

Cheltenham is twinned with:
 Annecy, Auvergne-Rhône-Alpes, France
 Cheltenham, Pennsylvania, United States
 Göttingen, Lower Saxony, Germany
 Weihai, Shandong,  China

Twinning with Sochi, Russia was suspended in response to 2022 Russian invasion of Ukraine.

Notable people

See also

 Acclaim Cheltenham, a game studio that made Extreme-G 3 and XGRA: Extreme-G Racing Association
 List of spa towns in the United Kingdom
 Cheltenham (UK Parliament constituency)
 Cotswold Brewing Co., a brewery based in Cheltenham
Arle Court Transport Hub

References

Bibliography
 David Verey, Gloucestershire: The Vale and the Forest of Dean, The Buildings of England edited by Nikolaus Pevsner, 2nd ed. (1976) 
 Commemorative Plaques of Cheltenham by Peter Smith & Sue Rowbotham (Reardon, 2009) .

External links

 Cheltenham Borough Council
 Visit Cheltenham
 Genealogical Web site including many relevant references on Cheltenham
 BBC archive film of Cheltenham from 1985
 Explore Cheltenham Explore Cheltenham Spa - Online guide to the 'Festival Town of England'

 
Towns in Gloucestershire
Spa towns in England
Non-metropolitan districts of Gloucestershire
Boroughs in England
Former civil parishes in Gloucestershire